Brande is a railway town in Jutland, Denmark

Brande may also refer to:

Places
 Brande-Hörnerkirchen, municipality in Schleswig-Holstein, Germany.
 Ikast-Brande Municipality, in Region Midtjylland, Denmark
 Brande House, historic house in Reading, Massachusetts

People

Given name
 Brande Roderick (born 1974), American model and actress

Surname
 Dorothea Brande (1893–1948), American writer and editor
 James Brande ( 1553–1563), English politician
 William Thomas Brande (1788–1866), English chemist

Characters
 R. J. Brande, fictional DC Comics character

See also
 Branle, also called Brande
 Brand (disambiguation)